Creía yo ("I Believed") is a short poem in Spanish written by Macedonio Fernández, first published in 1953, which has much to say on the power struggle of the trinity of life occurrences, Life, Love, and Death.  In the poetry of Macedonio, these three characters play a large role as important aspects of every person’s life.

Text and translation

Commentary
Throughout the seven lined poem, Macedonio maintains a constant rhythm and beat by writing each verse, except for the third, with eleven syllables, taking into account synalephas.  At the same time, Macedonio retains a soft, calm sound in his words with many uses of alliteration.  In the listening to Creía yo being read out loud, it is obvious that this poem was written with euphony in mind.  This style adds to the concept that Love, though subtle and delicate, is much stronger than Death.  Another form of alliteration that is utilized can be found in the vocals of the poem as well.  “Mas poco Muerte puede, pues no puede” In this one verse alone, the sounds of “m,” “ue,” and “p” are used often.  Yet these three sounds are also consistently used throughout the poem to maintain the steady pattern of sound.  The rhyme scheme for the poem is ABAAACA.

Spanish-language poems
1953 poems
Argentine poems
Poems about death